This is a partial list of guests who appeared on The Midnight Special.

1972 (pilot)
First aired: 8/19/1972
Andy Kaufman
Argent- "Hold Your Head Up" & "Tragedy"
John Denver (guest host) - "Take Me Home Country Roads" & "Goodbye Again"
Cass Elliot - "Leaving on a Jet Plane" duet w/John Denver
Harry Chapin - "Taxi"
David Clayton-Thomas (singer from Blood, Sweat & Tears) - "Yesterday's Music" & "Nobody Calls Me Prophet"
The Everly Brothers - "All I Have to Do Is Dream" & "Stories We Could Tell"
The Isley Brothers - "Pop That Thang"
Helen Reddy - "I Don't Know How to Love Him"
Linda Ronstadt - "Long, Long Time" & "The Fast One"
War - "Slippin' into Darkness"

1973
Al Green (guest host)
Albert Hammond
Albert King
Alvin Lee & Mylon LeFevre
Anne Murray (guest host) - "Danny's Song"
Aretha Franklin
The Association
B.B. King - "The Thrill is Gone" - Duet with Gladys Knight
Barbara Fairchild
Badfinger
The Bee Gees (guest host) - "Lonely Days"
Ben E. King
Bill Cosby (guest host)
Billy Paul - "Me And Mrs. Jones"
Billy Preston - "Will It Go Round in Circles"
Black Oak Arkansas
Blood, Sweat & Tears
Bloodstone
Bo Diddley
Bobby Day
Bobby Darin
Bobby Womack
Bonnie Bramlett
Brewer & Shipley - "One Toke Over The Line"
Bud Brisbois
Buddy Miles
The Byrds
Canned Heat
Carol Burnett
Charlie Rich
Chi Coltrane
Chubby Checker (guest host)
The Coasters
Commander Cody and His Lost Planet Airmen
The Committee
Conway Twitty
Country Joe McDonald
The Crusaders
Curtis Mayfield (guest host)
Danny & the Juniors
David Bowie - "Space Oddity"
David Brenner
Del Shannon
The Del-Vikings
Dionne Warwick (guest host)
Dobie Gray
Doc Severinsen (guest host)
The Doobie Brothers - "Jesus Is Just Alright" and "Listen To The Music"
Don Gibson
Don McLean
The Doobie Brothers - "Listen to the Music"
Doug Kershaw
Dr. John
Earl Scruggs
Edgar Winter Group - "Frankenstein"
Edward Bear
Edwin Hawkins Singers
Electric Light Orchestra
Eric Weissberg
Fanny
Flash featuring Peter Banks
Fleetwood Mac - "Miles Away", & "Believe Me"
Focus - "Hocus Pocus"
Foghat
Freddy Cannon
Gary Mule Deer
Genesis - "Watcher of the Skies", & "The Musical Box"
George Burns
George Carlin
George Jones
Gladys Knight & the Pips (guest hosts) - "Neither One of Us (Wants to Be the First to Say Goodbye)"
The Grass Roots
Gunhill Road
Harry Chapin (guest host)
Helen Reddy (guest host) - "Delta Dawn"
Henry Mancini
Herman’s Hermits
The Hollies
The Honey Cone - "Want Ads"
Hoyt Axton
The Incredible String Band
Ike & Tina Turner
The Impressions
Jack Burns and Avery Schreiber (guest hosts)
Jerry Butler
Jerry Lee Lewis (guest host)
Jim Croce (guest host) - "Bad, Bad Leroy Brown", "Operator (That's Not the Way It Feels)" and "I Got a Name"
Jim Weatherly
Jimmie Spheeris
Jimmy Clanton
Joan Baez (guest host)
Joan Rivers
Joe Walsh
John Kay
John Stewart
Johnny Rivers (guest host)
Johnny Mathis
Johnny Nash (guest host) - "I Can See Clearly Now"
Johnny Paycheck
Johnny Rodriguez
Johnny Winter
Jonathan Winters
Jose Feliciano (guest host)
Kenny Rankin
Kenny Rogers and The First Edition
King Crimson - "Larks' Tongues In Aspic Part 2" & "Easy Money"
King Harvest
Kris Kristofferson
Lakshmi Shankar
Leo Kottke
Leroy Hutson
Little Anthony & The Imperials
Linda Ronstadt - "Long, Long Time"
Livingston Taylor
Lloyd Price
Loggins & Messina - "Your Mama Don't Dance"
Lou Rawls (guest host)
Loretta Lynn (guest host)
Mac Davis (guest host) - "Baby Don't Get Hooked On Me"
Marty Robbins (guest host)
Malo
Melissa Manchester
Merrilee Rush
Mimi Fariña
The Miracles
Monty Python
Nitty Gritty Dirt Band
The O'Jays - "Back Stabbers" and "Love Train"
Paul Anka (guest host)
Paul Williams (guest host)
Rare Earth
The Penguins
Ramblin' Jack Elliott
The Raspberries
Ravi Shankar
Ray Charles (guest host)
Richard Pryor (guest host)
Rita Coolidge
Robert Klein
Ronnie Dyson
Savoy Brown
Seals & Crofts - "Summer Breeze"
The Searchers
Sha Na Na
Shawn Phillips
The Shirelles
Skeeter Davis
Skylark
The Skyliners
Slade
Sonny Terry and Brownie McGhee
The Spinners
Smokey Robinson (guest host)
The Staple Singers
The Statler Brothers
Steely Dan - "Reelin' In The Years"
Steve Goodman
Steve Martin
Steve Miller Band
Stories
The Stylistics
Tanya Tucker
Taj Mahal
Tammy Wynette
Timmy Thomas
Todd Rundgren - "Hello, It's Me"
Tom T. Hall
Tower of Power
T. Rex - "Bang-A-Gong (Get It On)"
War - "The Cisco Kid"
Waylon Jennings
Wilson Pickett
Wishbone Ash
Vicki Lawrence

1974
Aerosmith - "Train Kept A-Rollin'" and "Dream On"
Ann Peebles
Barry White - "Can't Get Enough of Your Love, Babe" and "Never, Never Gonna Give You Up"
Billy Joel
Bill Withers - "Ain't No Sunshine"
Bonnie Tyler - "It's a Heartache"  (This must be an error—song was not released until 1977)
Brownsville Station - "Smokin' in the Boys Room"
Charlie Rich - "Behind Closed Doors"
Curtis Mayfield - "Superfly"
David Brenner
David Essex - "Rock On"
Dobie Gray - "Drift Away"
Eddie Kendricks - "Keep On Truckin'"
Edgar Winter Group - "Frankenstein"
Edwin Starr
El Chicano
Freddie Prinze
Genesis
Gladys Knight & B.B. King - "The Thrill is Gone"
Gladys Knight & the Pips - "Best Thing That Ever Happened To Me"
Golden Earring - "Radar Love"
Gordon Lightfoot - "Sundown" and "If You Could Read My Mind"
The Guess Who - "American Woman" and"Undun"
Hot Tuna - "Hamar Promenade", "Day to Day Out the Window Blues" and "I See the Light"
Humble Pie - "Oh La-De-Da" and "30 Days in the Hole"
Ike & Tina Turner - "Proud Mary"
James Brown - "The Payback"
Jo Jo Gunne
Jobriath - "I'maman" and "Rock of Ages"
Kool And The Gang - "Hollywood Swinging and Jungle Boogie"
Leo Sayer
Loggins and Messina- "Your Mama Don't Dance"
Lynn Anderson
The Main Ingredient - "Just Don't Want To Be Lonely"
Maria Muldaur - "Midnight at the Oasis"
Marvin Gaye - "Let's Get It On and What's Going On"
Montrose - "Paper Money" and "I Got the Fire"
Neil Sedaka - "Laughter in the Rain"
The New York Dolls
The O'Jays - "Love Train"
Ohio Players - "Skin Tight"
Olivia Newton-John - "If You Love Me (Let Me Know)"
 The Spinners
Phil Ochs and Jim Glover - "The Power and the Glory" and "Changes"
Redbone - "Come and Get Your Love"
Robert Palmer - "Bad Case Of Lovin' You (Doctor, Doctor)"  (This must be an error—song was not released until 1979)
Rufus Featuring Chaka Khan - "Tell Me Something Good"
Shirley & Lee - "Let the Good Times Roll"
Sly & the Family Stone - "Everybody is a Star" and "Thank You (Falletin Me be Mice-Elf Again)"
Stories - "Brother Louie"
The Stylistics - "You Make Me Feel Brand New"
Todd Rundgren - "Couldn't I Just Tell You?" & "A Dream Goes On Forever"
War - "Cisco Kid"

1975
ABBA - "SOS" and "I Do, I Do, I Do, I Do, I Do"
Aretha Franklin and Ray Charles - "It Takes Two to Tango"
Barry Manilow - "Mandy" and "Could It Be Magic?"
The Bee Gees - "Nights on Broadway", "Jive Talkin'" and "To Love Somebody" (Duet With Helen Reddy)
Captain & Tennille - "Love Will Keep Us Together (Duet With Neil Sedaka)"
David Steinberg
Dolly Parton
Earth Wind and Fire - "Shining Star"
Electric Light Orchestra (guest hosts) - "In the Hall of the Mountain King", "Great Balls of Fire", "Can't Get It Out of My Head", "Orange Blossom Special", "Laredo Tornado", "Flight of the Bumble Bee" & "Roll Over Beethoven"
Frankie Valli (Guest Host) - "Can't Take My Eyes Off You"
Glen Campbell - "Rhinestone Cowboy"
Helen Reddy - "I Am Woman", "Delta Dawn" and "Angie Baby" 
The Hollies - "Long Cool Woman (In A Black Dress)"
Jack Burns & Avery Schreiber
KC and the Sunshine Band - "That's the Way (I Like It)"
KISS - "Black Diamond", "Deuce", & "She"
Kraftwerk - "Autobahn"
Labelle - "Lady Marmalade", “What Can I Do for You?”
 Leo Sayer
 Linda Ronstadt
Minnie Riperton - "Lovin' You"
Natalie Cole - "This Will Be (An Everlasting Love)"
Neil Sedaka - "Bad Blood and Breaking Up Is Hard To Do"
Ohio Players - "Love Rollercoaster"
Olivia Newton-John - "Have You Never Been Mellow"
Orleans - "Dance with Me"
Peter Frampton - "Show Me the Way", "Do You Feel Like We Do", "Baby, I Love Your Way"
PFM - "Celebration" and "Alta Loma Nine Till Five"'
Rod Stewart - "You Wear It Well"
Roxy Music - "Out Of The Blue", "The Thrill Of It All", "A Really Good Time" (aired 05/09/1975, synched to the studio tracks from the Country Life album with live vocals from Bryan Ferry and John Wetton)
Todd Rundgren - "Real Man", "Freedom Fighters" & "Seven Rays"
The Whitney Family

1976
Aretha Franklin - "Respect", "Something He Can Feel"
Bill Haley & His Comets "Rock Around the Clock", "See You Later Alligator" (archive footage from the movie Rock Around the Clock)
Diana Ross - "Love Hangover"
Donna Summer - "Love to Love You Baby"
Electric Light Orchestra - "Evil Woman", "Nightrider" & "Strange Magic"
Elton John - "Your Song"
Electric Light Orchestra - "Evil Woman", "Can't Get It Out of My Head" and "Strange Magic"
England Dan and John Ford Coley - "I'd Really Love to See You Tonight"
Eric Carmen - "All By Myself"
Fleetwood Mac - "Over My Head", "Rhiannon", "World Turning", "Why"
Gary Wright - "Dream Weaver", "Love Is Alive"
George Benson - "This Masquerade"
Heart - "Magic Man", "Crazy On You", "Dreamboat Annie"
 Helen Reddy
Hot Chocolate - "You Sexy Thing"
Janis Ian - "At Seventeen"
Joan Baez - "The Night They Drove Old Dixie Down"
LaBelle - "Lady Marmalade"
Lynn Anderson - "Stand By Your Man", "Don't Go Breaking My Heart" w/Tom Jones
Minnie Riperton - "Lovin' You"
The Miracles - "Love Machine"
Michael Murphey - "Wildfire"
Peter Frampton - "Show Me the Way"
Ray Charles - "Georgia on My Mind"
Spinners - "The Rubberband Man"
Starbuck - "Moonlight Feels Right"
Tom Jones - "Delilah, "Don't Go Breaking My Heart" w/Lynn Anderson
Walter Murphy and The Big Apple Band - "A Fifth of Beethoven"
Wild Cherry - "Play That Funky Music"

1977
Andrew Gold - "Lonely Boy"
Andy Gibb - "I Just Want To Be Your Everything"
Andy Kaufman - "I Trusted You"
Bonnie Raitt - "Runaway"
Bread (hosts) - "Make It With You"
Dave Mason - "We Just Disagree"
Eddie Rabbitt - "Rocky Mountain Music"
Electric Light Orchestra (hosts) - "Rockaria!", "Livin' Thing", "Do Ya", "Telephone Line" & "Livin' Thing (reprise)"
Emmylou Harris
The Emotions - "Best Of My Love"
Gino Vannelli - "Summers of My Life"
James Brown - "Get Up Offa That Thing"
Jennifer Warnes - "Right Time of the Night"
Jesse Winchester -
Johnny Rivers - "Slow Dancin'"
Journey "Feeling That Way " "Anytime" "Wheel in the Sky"
Leo Sayer - "You Make Me Feel Like Dancing"
Little Feat - "Dixie Chicken"
Lou Rawls - "You'll Never Find Another Love Like Mine"
Manfred Mann's Earth Band - "Blinded by the Light"
Marilyn McCoo & Billy Davis, Jr. - "You Don't Have To Be A Star (To Be In My Show)"
Marvin Gaye - "What's Going On", "Got to Give It Up"
Player
Renaissance - "Midas Man" & "Carpet of the Sun"
Sanford-Townsend Band - "Smoke from a Distant Fire"
Thelma Houston - "Don't Leave Me This Way"
Van Morrison - "Domino"
Weather Report - "Birdland"

1978
AC/DC - "Sin City"
Aerosmith - "Come Together"
Ambrosia - "How Much I Feel"
Andy Gibb - "I Just Want To Be Your Everything"
 Billy Preston "Nothing From Nothing"
The Cars - "Just What I Needed"
Cheap Trick - "Surrender"
Chic - "Le Freak"
Chuck Mangione - "Feels So Good"
Crystal Gayle - "Don't It Make My Brown Eyes Blue"
Dan Hill - "Sometimes When We Touch"
 David Bowie
 Dolly Parton
Donna Summer - "Last Dance", "I Feel Love", "Heaven Knows"
Eddie Money - "Baby Hold On," "Two Tickets to Paradise"
Electric Light Orchestra - "Telephone Line"
The Emotions - "Best Of My Love"
Evelyn Champagne King - "Shame", "I Don't Know If It's Right"
Exile - "Kiss You All Over"
Four Tops - "Ain't No Woman (Like The One I've Got)"
 George Benson
Golden Earring - "Grab It for a Second", "Against the Grain"
Hall & Oates - "Rich Girl"
 KC and the Sunshine Band
Leo Sayer - "When I Need You"
Nick Lowe- "So It Goes"
 Peaches & Herb
Player
REO Speedwagon - "Roll With The Changes"
Rick James - "Mary Jane"
Robert Palmer - "Every Kinda People"
Ronnie Montrose - Town Without Pity & "My Little Mystery"
Starland Vocal Band - "Afternoon Delight"
Sylvester - "You Make Me Feel (Mighty Real)", "Dance (Disco Heat)", and "Grateful"
Ted Nugent - "Cat Scratch Fever", "Need You Bad", "Free For All" (Hosted this Show)
 The O'Jays - "For The Love Of Money"
Sammy Hagar - "You Make Me Crazy"
Thin Lizzy - "The Cowboy Song", "Live From the Rainbow London"
Todd Rundgren - "Can We Still Be Friends" & "Bread" (with the Hello People)
Todd Rundgren's Utopia - (guest host) "Real Man", "You Cried Wolf", "Love in Action", "Sometimes I Don't Know What to Feel" & "Just One Victory"
Tom Petty & The Heartbreakers - "American Girl", Listen To Her Heart and I Need to Know"
The Trammps - "Disco Inferno"
Village People
Yvonne Elliman - "If I Can't Have You"

1979
Alice Cooper - "Medley: Eighteen/Only Women Bleed/Billion Dollar Babies," "Inmates (We're All Crazy)"
Amii Stewart - "Knock on Wood"
The Babys - "Everytime I Think of You"
The Beach Boys - "Good Vibrations"
Bonnie Pointer - "Heaven Must Have Sent You"
Blondie - "One Way or Another," "Dreaming," "Heart of Glass"
The Cars - "Let's Go," "Just What I Needed," "Dangerous Type, "My Best Friend's Girl"
The Charlie Daniels Band - "The Devil Went Down to Georgia"
The Commodores - "Three Times a Lady", "Brick House"
Crystal Gayle - "Cry Me a River"
Dolly Parton - "I Will Always Love You"
Gloria Gaynor - "I Will Survive," "Never Can Say Good-bye"
Grace Jones - "Below the Belt", "Do or Die"
Journey - "Lovin', Touchin', Squeezin'," "Wheel in the Sky," "City of The Angels"
 KC and the Sunshine Band
Minnie Riperton - "Lovin' You" (memorial replay of her 1975 appearance)
Nick Gilder - "Hot Child in the City"
Peaches & Herb - "Reunited,"  "Shake Your Groove Thing"
The Pointer Sisters - "Fire"
Randy Jones
Rick James - "You and I"
Robert Fripp - "Frippertronics"
Rupert Holmes - "Escape (The Piña Colada Song)"
The Three Degrees - "Giving Up Giving In", The Runner"
The Jacksons - "Shake Your Body Down To The Ground"
 Tina Turner
 Todd Rundgren
 Village People

1980
America - "Sister Golden Hair"
Benny Mardones - "Into the Night"
 Billy Preston
 Christopher Cross
 David Bowie
Eddie Rabbitt - "Drivin' My Life Away"
Frankie Valli & Commodores - "Grease"
 Gladys Knight & the Pips
Hall & Oates - "Kiss on My List"
 Leo Sayer
Olivia Newton-John - "Magic", "Dancin'"
 Randy Jones
REO Speedwagon - "Keep on Loving You"
Roy Orbison - (Host, Season 8, Episode 25) "Oh, Pretty Woman", "Only the Lonely", "Crying", "Running Scared", "Hound Dog Man", "Blue Bayou" & "The Eyes of Texas"
The Oak Ridge Boys - "Leaving Louisiana in the Broad Daylight"
 The Spinners
Dr. Hook
Prince

1981
707 - "Tonite's Your Night"
Andy Kaufman
 David Bowie
Freddy Cannon - "Tallahassee Lassie"
Slim Whitman - "I Remember You"
 The Spinners
Tony Clifton

References

Midnight Special, The